Dmitry Sychugov (born 1955) is a Russian mathematician, Dr.Sc., Professor, a professor at the Faculty of Computer Science at the Moscow State University.

He graduated from the faculty MSU CMC (1976). Has been working at Moscow State University since 1980.

He defended the thesis «Mathematical modeling of plasma confinement processes in toroidal traps» for the degree of Doctor of Physical and Mathematical Sciences (2013).

He is the author of five books and more than 80 scientific articles.

Area of scientific interests: mathematical modeling, computational physics of plasma.

References

Bibliography

External links
 MSU CMC
 Scientific works of Dmitry Sychugov
 Scientific works of Dmitry Sychugov

Russian computer scientists
Russian mathematicians
Living people
Academic staff of Moscow State University
1955 births
Moscow State University alumni